Brian Foster (born April 3, 1984) is an American mixed martial artist and kickboxer currently competing for the Professional Fighters League. A professional since 2006, he has also competed for the UFC. He won the WSOF Lightweight Tournament in 2015. Only one of his 41 career bouts has made it to a judges' decision.

Background
Foster began his professional MMA career in 2006, after his brother died. In an interview with FightLockdown.com, Foster stated that "martial arts have changed me, it's made me a more humble and respectful individual. My brother’s death did make me a very angry person, so very shortly after it happened, I started training and used the physical stress of training to cancel out the emotional pain caused by his death. I like to think he is very proud of what I have accomplished since his passing [...] I take a photo of my brother with me to every fight."

Mixed martial arts career

Early career
Foster got his start fighting for the Masters of the Cage company. Foster fought six times for the promotion and went 4–2 and won eight consecutive fights before losing to future The Ultimate Fighter winner, Diego Brandão. Foster bounced back and won his next three fights before getting signed by the Ultimate Fighting Championship.

Ultimate Fighting Championship
At UFC 103, Foster was set to make his debut against highly regarded Englishman, Paul Daley. Daley replaced Mike Swick in a fight with Martin Kampmann, leaving Foster without an opponent. Instead of Daley, he ended up fighting Rick Story and lost via arm-triangle choke submission in the second round.

At UFC 106 on November 21, 2009, Foster defeated Brock Larson by TKO in the second round after taking an illegal kick to the head and an illegal knee to the head in the first round.

Foster stepped in for an injured Dong Hyun Kim at UFC 110 to face Chris Lytle. He lost due to a kneebar submission in the first round.

Foster next faced Forrest Petz on September 15, 2010, at UFC Fight Night 22. He won in the first round by TKO.

Foster then faced Matt Brown at UFC 123, replacing an injured Rory MacDonald. Foster won the fight by guillotine choke submission in the second round.

In 2010, an inadvertent groin strike sustained during training burst Foster's testicle and it had to be surgically removed. Later, when he was cleared to continue training for upcoming Pierson fight at UFC 129, a pre-fight MRI showed clear signs of a brain hemorrhage. The second MRI taken of his brain showed no signs of hemorrhage.  However, Foster was left without a fight and subsequently he was released from UFC. According to Foster, there was miscommunication in the media leading to reports of him going through a brain surgery but Foster stated they were false.

Post-UFC
Now fully recovered, Foster's next fight was against Jack Mason at Cage Warriors Fighting Championship 44. He won the fight by standing guillotine choke submission in the first round.

Foster defeated LaVerne Clark via first-round submission at Capital City Cage Wars 7 on October 15, 2011.

World Series of Fighting/Professional Fighters League
Foster joined the World Series of Fighting in 2014.  In his first fight for the promotion, Foster faced Jake Shields in the main event of WSOF 17 on January 17, 2015.  He lost the fight via submission in the first round.

In his second fight for the promotion, Foster defeated LaRue Burley via knockout with a right hook at 34 seconds of the first round at WSOF 23 on September 18, 2015.

Foster then entered WSOF's one night Lightweight tournament to determine the number one contender for the Lightweight Championship.  He faced Joáo Zeferino in the quarter finals and lost via submission due to a heel hook.  However, a number of injuries plagued the semifinalists and Foster continued as an injury substitution.  He faced Luis Palomino in the semifinals and won via TKO in the second round.  In the finals, he faced Zeferino in a rematch and won the fight via knockout in the second round to win the tournament.

Foster faced Luiz Firmino at WSOF 33 on October 7, 2016. He won the fight via triangle choke submission in the first round.

Foster faced Jon Fitch in a welterweight title bout on June 30, 2017, at Professional Fighters League 36: Fitch vs. Foster. He lost the fight in the second round due to submission.

Foster faced Ramsey Nijem in the initial round of Professional Fighters League's lightweight tournament. Foster won the fight via ground and pound, stemming from a flying knee to Nijem's head.

Kickboxing
Foster made his debut as a kickboxer and Glory fighter at GLORY 11 in Hoffman Estates, Illinois on October 12, 2013.  He lost via TKO in the first round following a spinning heel kick from Raymond Daniels.

Kickboxing record

|-  style="background:#fbb;"
| 2013-10-12 || Loss ||align=left| Raymond Daniels || Glory 11: Chicago || Hoffman Estates, Illinois, USA || TKO (right spinning heel kick) || 1 || 2:24 || 0–1
|-
| colspan=9 |Legend:

Championships and accomplishments
Ultimate Fighting Championship
Fight of the Night (One time) vs. Rick Story 
Knockout of the Night (One time) vs. Forrest Petz 
World Series of Fighting
WSOF Lightweight Tournament Winner
Victory Fighting Championship
VFC Welterweight Championship (One time, current)

Mixed martial arts record

|-
|Win
|align=center|29–12
|Cliff Wright
|Submission (kimura)
|MMAX FC 9: High Stakes 2
|
|align=center|1
|align=center|2:20
|Poteau, Oklahoma, United States
|
|-
|Loss
|align=center|28–12
|Amirkhan Adaev
|DQ (Illegal Upkick)
|ACA 101: Strus vs. Nemchinov
|
|align=center|2
|align=center|3:17
|Warsaw, Poland
|  
|-
|Loss
|align=center|28–11
|Abdul-Aziz Abdulvakhabov
|Submission (arm-triangle choke)
|ACA 92: Yagshimuradov vs. Celiński
|
|align=center|1
|align=center|1:38
|Warsaw, Poland
|
|-
| Win
| align=center|28–10
| Ramsey Nijem
| TKO (knee and punches)
| PFL 2
| 
| align=center| 3
| align=center| 0:32
| Chicago, Illinois, United States
| 
|-
| Loss
| align=center|27–10
| Jon Fitch
| Submission (side choke)
|PFL: Daytona
| 
| align=center| 2
| align=center| 3:12
| Daytona Beach, Florida, United States
| 
|-
|Win
|align=center|27–9
|Luiz Firmino
|Submission (triangle choke)
|WSOF 33
|
|align=center|1
|align=center|3:14
|Kansas City, Missouri, United States
|
|-
|Loss
|align=center|26–9
|Justin Gaethje 
|TKO (leg kicks)
|WSOF 29
|
|align=center|1
|align=center|1:43
|Greeley, Colorado, United States
|
|-
|Win
|align=center|26–8
|João Zeferino
|KO (punches)
| rowspan=3 |WSOF 25
| rowspan=3 |
|align=center|2
|align=center|4:51
| rowspan=3 |Phoenix, Arizona, United States
|
|-
|Win
|align=center|25–8
|Luis Palomino
|TKO (punches)
|align=center|2
|align=center|4:19
|
|-
|Loss
|align=center|24–8
|João Zeferino
|Submission (heel hook)
|align=center|1
|align=center|1:46
|
|-
| Win
|align=center| 24–7
|LaRue Burley
|KO (punch)
|WSOF 23
|
|align=center|1
|align=center|0:32
|Phoenix, Arizona, United States
|
|-
| Win
|align=center| 23–7
|Marcio Navarro
|TKO (knee and punches)
|XFI 14
|
|align=center|1
|align=center|0:45
|Fort Smith, Arkansas, United States
|Lightweight debut.
|-
| Loss
|align=center| 22–7
| Jake Shields
| Submission (rear-naked choke)
| WSOF 17
| 
|align=center|1
|align=center|2:51
|Las Vegas, Nevada, United States
|
|-
| Win
|align=center| 22–6
| Gilbert Smith
| Decision (unanimous)
|  Titan FC 28: Brilz vs. Davis
| 
|align=center|3
|align=center|5:00
|Newkirk, Oklahoma, United States
|
|-
| Win 
| align=center| 21–6
| Rodrigo Soria
| Submission (armbar)
| RDC MMA: Reto de Campeones 2
| 
| align=center| 1
| align=center| 2:39
| Mexico City, Mexico  
|
|-
| Win 
| align=center| 20–6
| Mitch Whitesel
| Submission (armbar)
| C3 Fights: Border Wars 2014
| 
| align=center| 1
| align=center| 4:37
| Newkirk, Oklahoma, United States  
|
|-
| Win 
| align=center| 19–6
| James Wood
| KO (spinning back kick)
| Victory Fighting Championship 40
| 
| align=center| 2
| align=center| 0:43
| Ralston, Nebraska, United States  
| 
|-
| Loss
| align=center| 18–6
| Daniel Roberts
| Submission (rear naked choke)
| Combat MMA
| 
| align=center| 1
| align=center| 1:29
| Tulsa, Oklahoma, United States
| 
|-
| Win
| align=center| 18–5
| LaVerne Clark
| Submission (armbar)
| Capital City Cage Wars 7
| 
| align=center| 1
| align=center| 2:31
| Springfield, Illinois, United States
| 
|-
| Win
| align=center| 17–5
| Jack Mason
| Submission (guillotine choke)
| Cage Warriors: 44
| 
| align=center| 1
| align=center| 2:15
| Kentish Town, London, England
|Catchweight (181 lbs) bout.
|-
| Win
| align=center| 16–5
| Matt Brown
| Submission (guillotine choke)
| UFC 123
| 
| align=center| 2
| align=center| 2:11
| Auburn Hills, Michigan, United States
| 
|-
| Win
| align=center| 15–5
| Forrest Petz
| TKO (punches)
| UFC Fight Night: Marquardt vs. Palhares
| 
| align=center| 1
| align=center| 1:07
| Austin, Texas, United States
| 
|-
| Loss
| align=center| 14–5
| Chris Lytle
| Submission (kneebar)
| UFC 110
| 
| align=center| 1
| align=center| 1:41
| Sydney, Australia
| 
|-
| Win
| align=center| 14–4
| Brock Larson
| TKO (submission to punches)
| UFC 106
| 
| align=center| 2
| align=center| 3:25
| Las Vegas, Nevada, United States
| 
|-
|  Loss
| align=center| 13–4
| Rick Story
| Submission (arm-triangle choke)
| UFC 103
| 
| align=center| 2
| align=center| 1:09
| Dallas, Texas, United States
| 
|-
|  Win
| align=center| 13–3
| Kyle Baker
| KO (punches)
| Shine Fights 1: Genesis
| 
| align=center| 1
| align=center| 0:59
| Columbus, Ohio, United States
| 
|-
|  Win
| align=center| 12–3
| Mike Jackson
| KO (punches)
| PB MMA: Return to Glory
| 
| align=center| 1
| align=center| 0:05
| Fort Smith, Arkansas, United States
| 
|-
|  Win
| align=center| 11–3
| Nathan Coy
| Submission (kimura)
| Pro Battle MMA: Immediate Impact
| 
| align=center| 1
| align=center| 4:08
| Springdale, Arkansas, United States
| 
|-
|  Loss
| align=center| 10–3
| Diego Brandão
| KO (punches)
| TAP Entertainment: Fight Night
| 
| align=center| 1
| align=center| 1:34
| Sallisaw, Oklahoma, United States
| 
|-
|  Win
| align=center| 10–2
| Douglas Edwards
| Submission (armbar)
| LFC 1: The Genesis
| 
| align=center| 1
| align=center| 2:00
| Wichita, Kansas, United States
| 
|-
|  Win
| align=center| 9–2
| Nuri Shakir
| Submission (guillotine choke)
| AOW: Gi's vs Pro's
| 
| align=center| 1
| align=center| 1:09
| Tunica, Mississippi, United States
| 
|-
|  Win
| align=center| 8–2
| Ken Jackson
| TKO (punches)
| Warriors of the Cage 1
| 
| align=center| 3
| align=center| 0:40
| Oklahoma City, Oklahoma, United States
| 
|-
|  Win
| align=center| 7–2
| Phet Phongsavane
| Submission (rear-naked choke)
| Night of Champions: Power, Pride and Honor
| 
| align=center| 1
| align=center| N/A
| Alexandria, Louisiana, United States
| 
|-
|  Win
| align=center| 6–2
| Derik Bolton
| TKO (punches)
| Blackeye Productions
| 
| align=center| 1
| align=center| 1:30
| Fort Smith, Arkansas, United States
| 
|-
|  Win
| align=center| 5–2
| Steve Carl
| TKO (punches)
| Masters of the Cage 7
| 
| align=center| 1
| align=center| 4:34
| Norman, Oklahoma, United States
| 
|-
|  Win
| align=center| 4–2
| James Inhoff
| Submission
| Blackeye Productions
| 
| align=center| 1
| align=center| 2:25
| Arkansas, United States
| 
|-
|  Win
| align=center| 3–2
| Jeff Davis
| TKO (punches)
| Masters of the Cage 5
| 
| align=center| 1
| align=center| 2:44
| Oklahoma City, Oklahoma, United States
| 
|-
|  Loss
| align=center| 2–2
| TJ Waldburger
| Submission (armbar)
| Masters of the Cage 4
| 
| align=center| 1
| align=center| 0:29
| Oklahoma City, Oklahoma, United States
| 
|-
|  Win
| align=center| 2–1
| Jeff Davis
| Submission
| Masters of the Cage 3
| 
| align=center| 3
| align=center| 1:19
| Oklahoma City, Oklahoma, United States
| 
|-
|  Loss
| align=center| 1–1
| Jeff Davis
| Submission (choke)
| Masters of the Cage 2
| 
| align=center| 3
| align=center| 0:54
| Oklahoma City, Oklahoma, United States
| 
|-
|  Win
| align=center| 1–0
| Deric Harris
| KO (punch)
| Masters of the Cage 2
| 
| align=center| 1
| align=center| 1:09
| Oklahoma City, Oklahoma, United States
|

References

External links
 
 

1984 births
Living people
People from Sallisaw, Oklahoma
American male mixed martial artists
Welterweight mixed martial artists
Mixed martial artists utilizing Brazilian jiu-jitsu
American male kickboxers
Kickboxers from Oklahoma
Middleweight kickboxers
Mixed martial artists from Oklahoma
Ultimate Fighting Championship male fighters
American practitioners of Brazilian jiu-jitsu